Kevin Curren and Steve Denton were the defending champions, but Curren did not participate this year.  Denton partnered Victor Amaya, losing in the second round.

Mark Dickson and Jan Gunnarsson won the title, defeating Sherwood Stewart and Ferdi Taygan 7–6, 6–7, 6–4 in the final.

Seeds

Draw

Finals

Top half

Bottom half

References
Draw

Stockholm Open
1982 Grand Prix (tennis)